Big Life was a record label established in 1987 by Jazz Summers and Tim Parry. It featured hundreds of releases from artists such as The Orb, Stare, Yazz, Junior Reid, Coldcut, De La Soul, and Damage.

In 1999, the label was put into receivership. In 2008, it was purchased by Universal Music Publishing Group.

See also
 Lists of record labels

References

External links
Big Life Web Site

British record labels
Record labels established in 1987
Electronic dance music record labels
Pop record labels